Luis de Molina  (29 September 1535 – 12 October 1600) was a Spanish Jesuit priest and scholastic, a staunch defender of free will in the controversy over human liberty and God's grace. His theology is known as Molinism.

Life
From 1551 to 1562, Molina studied law in Salamanca, philosophy in Alcala de Henares, and theology in Coimbra.  After 1563, he became a professor at the University of Coimbra, and afterward taught at the University of Évora, Portugal.  From this post he was called, at the end of twenty years, to the chair of moral theology in Madrid, where he died.

Besides other works he wrote De liberi arbitrii cum gratiae donis, divina praescientia, praedestinatione et reprobatione concordia (4 vols., Lisbon, 1588); a commentary on the first part of the Summa Theologiae of Thomas Aquinas (2 vols., fol., Cuenca, 1593); and a treatise De jure et justitia (6 vols., 1593–1609).

It is to the first of these that his fame is principally due. It was an attempt to reconcile, in words at least, the Augustinian doctrines of predestination and efficacious grace with the new ideals of the Renaissance concerning free will. Assuming that man is free to perform or not to perform any act whatever, Molina maintains that this circumstance renders the grace of God neither unnecessary nor impossible: not impossible, for God never fails to bestow grace upon those who ask it with sincerity; and not unnecessary, for grace, although not an efficient, is still a sufficient cause of salvation (gratia mere sufficiens, "merely sufficient grace"). Nor, in Molina's view, does his doctrine of free will exclude predestination. The omniscient God, by means of His scientia media (the phrase is Molina's invention, though the idea is also to be found in his older contemporary Fonseca), or power of knowing future contingent events, foresees how we shall employ our own free-will and treat his proffered grace, and upon this foreknowledge he can found his predestinating decrees.

These doctrines, which opposed both traditional understanding of Augustinism and Thomism concerning the respective roles of free will and efficacious grace, and the teachings of Martin Luther and John Calvin, excited violent controversy in some quarters, especially on the part of the Dominican Order and of the Jansenists, and at last rendered it necessary for the Pope (Clement VIII) to intervene. At first (1594) he simply enjoined silence on both parties so far as Spain was concerned; but ultimately, in 1598, he appointed the Congregatio de auxiliis Gratiae for the settlement of the dispute, which became more and more a party one. After holding very numerous sessions, the congregation was able to decide nothing, and in 1607 its meetings were suspended by Paul V, who in 1611 prohibited all further discussion of the question de auxiliis and of discussions about efficacious grace, and studious efforts were made to control the publication even of commentaries on Aquinas .

Several regent Masters of the Dominican College of St. Thomas, the future Pontifical University of Saint Thomas Aquinas (Angelicum), were involved in the Molinist controversy. The Dominicans Diego Álvarez (c. 1550–1635), author of the De auxiliis divinae gratiae et humani arbitrii viribus, and Tomás de Lemos (1540–1629) were given the responsibility of representing the Dominican Order in debates before Pope Clement VIII and Pope Paul V.

The Molinist subsequently passed into the Jansenist controversy.

Molina was also the first Jesuit to write at length on economics and contract law.  Prior to Molina's time, economic thought was closely tied to Catholic moral theology. Molina was part of an emerging trend which contributed to the separation of analysis of economic activity from theological questions of sin.  This trend was a significant step towards the emergence of modern economics with Adam Smith in the 18th century.  In his writings on economics, Molina helped further develop a theory of price inflation proposed by Juan de Medina and Martín de Azpilcueta in Salamanca, writing that "[i]n equal circumstances, the more abundant money is in one place, so much less is its value to buy things or to acquire things that are not money."

Works 
De liberi arbitrii cum gratiae donis, divina praescientia, praedestinatione et reprobatione concordia, 4 vols., Lisbona, 1588; 2nd ed. Antwerp, 1595.

De jure et justitia, 6 vols., 1593–1609.

Notes

References

An article by Alfred J. Freddoso on Luis Molina's thoughts.
Article on Molina from Catholic Encyclopedia (1911)
Article on Molinism from Catholic Encyclopedia (1911)
 Ulrich L. Lehner (ed.), Die scholastische Theologie im Zeitalter der Gnadenstreitigkeiten (monograph series, first volume: 2007) https://web.archive.org/web/20070812004619/http://www.bautz.de/rfn.html
 Luis de Molina, A Treatise on Money. CLP Academic, 2015.

Further reading
A full account of Molina's theology will be found in Gerhard Schneeman's Entstehung der thomistisch-molinistischen Controverse, published in the Appendices (Nos. 9, 13, 14) to the Jesuit periodical, Stimmen aus Maria-Laach.

Ernest Renan's article, Les congregations de auxiliis in his Nouvelles études d'histoire religieuse.
 Alonso-Lasheras, Diego. "Luis de Molina's De Iustitia et Iure. Justice as Virtue in an Economic Context", Leiden: Brill 2011.
 Matthias Kaufmann, Alexander Aichele (eds.), A Companion to Luis de Molina, Leiden: Brill 2014.
 MacGregor, Kirk. Luis de Molina: The Life and Theology of the Founder of Middle Knowledge. Grand Rapids: Zondervan 2015. [the first full book on Molina]
 Smith, Gerard (ed.) Jesuit thinkers of the Renaissance, Milwaukee (USA) 1939, pp. 75–132.
 A critical edition of Treatise on Money was translated and published by Christian's Library Press as A Treatise on Money (2015): Luis de Molina, A Treatise on Money . CLP Academic, 2015.

External links

Luis de Molina in the Historical Archives of the Pontifical Gregorian University
On Divine Foreknowledge: Part IV of the Concordia at the Internet Archive 

1535 births
1600 deaths
People from Cuenca, Spain
University of Coimbra alumni
16th-century Spanish Roman Catholic theologians
Spanish male writers
16th-century Spanish Jesuits
Catholic philosophers
Academic staff of the University of Évora
Mercantilists
University of Salamanca alumni
16th-century Spanish philosophers
School of Salamanca
16th-century Spanish jurists
Jesuit philosophers
Jesuit theologians